Malayanma script was a writing system used in Thiruvananthapuram district of Kerala. It was used to write the Malayalam language. Malayanma belongs to the same script family like Kolezhuthu and Vattezhuthu.

References

Malayalam language
Brahmic scripts